José Junior Julio Bueno (born 3 September 1996) is a Colombian professional footballer who plays as a centre-back for Ararat-Armenia.

Career
Bueno joined Banfield's youth system in 2015. Two years later, Bueno was signed by Primera B Metropolitana side Defensores de Belgrano. He made his professional bow during a defeat away to Platense in September 2017. Defensores de Belgrano won promotion to Primera B Nacional at the conclusion of the 2017–18 campaign via the play-offs, though Bueno didn't feature in them. On 12 July 2018, Bueno moved to Gimnasia y Esgrima of the second tier. His first appearance came in the Copa Argentina later that month against Almagro. Bueno agreed a departure in June 2019 to Once Caldas of Categoría Primera A.

For Once Caldas, Bueno scored his first senior goal on 27 November 2020 during a 5–2 league defeat away to Millonarios. On 23 January 2021, Bueno completed a move to Armenian football with Premier League outfit Ararat-Armenia. He debuted in an Armenian Cup quarter-final first leg on 12 March at home to Van, a week prior to making his league bow against the same opponents away from home.

Career statistics
.

References

External links

1996 births
Living people
People from La Guajira Department
Colombian footballers
Association football defenders
Colombian expatriate footballers
Expatriate footballers in Argentina
Expatriate footballers in Armenia
Colombian expatriate sportspeople in Argentina
Colombian expatriate sportspeople in Armenia
Primera B Metropolitana players
Primera Nacional players
Categoría Primera A players
Armenian Premier League players
Defensores de Belgrano footballers
Gimnasia y Esgrima de Jujuy footballers
Once Caldas footballers
FC Ararat-Armenia players